The 1906 Franklin football team represented Franklin College of Indiana in the 1906 college football season.

Schedule

References

Franklin
Franklin Grizzlies football seasons
Franklin Baptists football